The basket or hoop is a piece of basketball equipment, consisting of the rim and net. It hangs from the backboard. The first basket was a peach basket installed by James Naismith. The bottom was eventually cut out of the basket, and the basket was eventually replaced with the metal rim and net. Today there are breakaway rims.

A field goal is a shot that goes through the basket.

References

Basketball